Captain Henry Adelbert Wellington FitzRoy Somerset, 9th Duke of Beaufort JP, DL (19 May 1847 – 24 November 1924), styled Earl of Glamorgan until 1853 and Marquess of Worcester between 1853 and 1899, was a British peer.

Background and education
Beaufort was the son of Henry Somerset, 8th Duke of Beaufort. He was educated at Eton College between 1860 and 1864.

Military service and public appointments
Beaufort became a cornet in 1865 in the Royal Horse Guards and was promoted to captain in 1869. He was aide-de-camp to Queen Victoria in 1899 and served as High Steward of Bristol in 1899. On 8 January 1900 he was appointed a Deputy Lieutenant of Brecknockshire. He was Hereditary Keeper of Raglan Castle. He gained the rank of honorary colonel in the service of the Royal Gloucestershire Hussars. He was a Justice of the Peace for Monmouthshire and Gloucestershire and a Deputy Lieutenant of Gloucestershire and Monmouthshire.

Family

Beaufort married Louise Emily Harford (1864–1945), widow of a Dutch nobleman (Baron Charles Frederic van Tuyll van Serooskerken, 1859–1893, leaving two sons), on 9 October 1895. They had three children:

 Lady Blanche Linnie Somerset (1897–1968), married John Eliot, 6th Earl of St Germans (11 June 1890 – 31 March 1922), who died in a riding accident during a steeplechase, aged 31, leaving as issue two daughters. On 15 July 1924, she married George Francis Valentine Scott Douglas (14 February 1898 – 12 June 1930), who died from a polo injury. They had one son who died as the last of the Douglas baronets of Maxwell in 1969. Her descendants are the sole surviving descendants of the 9th Duke. Lady Blanche's eldest surviving grandson, David John Seyfried-Herbert, 19th Baron Herbert, eventually had the barony of Herbert called out of abeyance in his favour in 2002, after eighteen years.
 Lady Diana Maud Nina Somerset (12 September 1898 – 6 May 1935), married Captain Lindsey Shedden (1881–1971) on 19 September 1925, but had no known issue.
 Henry Hugh Arthur FitzRoy Somerset, 10th Duke of Beaufort (4 April 1900 – 5 February 1984), married Princess Mary of Teck. He left no issue and was succeeded by David Somerset, a first cousin twice removed.

The 9th Duke of Beaufort died in 1924, aged 77, at Badminton House, Gloucestershire. He is buried at St Michael and All Angels Church, Badminton.

Ancestry

References

External links 

1847 births
1924 deaths
Royal Horse Guards officers
Deputy Lieutenants of Brecknockshire
Deputy Lieutenants of Gloucestershire
Deputy Lieutenants of Monmouthshire
109
17
09
Masters of foxhounds in England
People educated at Eton College
Henry Somerset, 09th Duke of Beaufort
Presidents of the Marylebone Cricket Club
People from Badminton, Gloucestershire